The 1886 Western Maori by-election was a by-election held in the  electorate during the 9th New Zealand Parliament, on 23 December 1886. The by-election was caused by the death of the incumbent, Te Puke Te Ao, and was won by Hoani Taipua.

Background
Te Ao died in October 1886. This triggered the by-election, which was held on 23 December 1886.

The election
The nomination meeting was held on 2 December 1868 at the court house in Wanganui, with George Thomas Wilkinson presiding as the returning officer. The candidates were nominated in the following order: Hoani Taipua, Ngawaka Taurua, Henare Kaihau of Waiuku, Wiremu Te Wheoro, and Sydney Taiwhanga. The show of hands was strongly in favour of Hoani Taipua, and Te Wheoro demanded a poll, for which 23 December was set.

The by-election was a decisive win for Hoani Taipua, who gained an absolute majority of the votes, and had a 33% lead over the second-placed candidate, Wiremu Te Wheoro.

Election results

1884 election

The 1884 general election was contested by eight candidates in the Western Maori electorate.

1886 by-election

Notes

References

Western Maori 1886
1886 elections in New Zealand
Māori politics